The bluntsnout smooth-head, black slickhead, cope's bluntsnout smooth-head, or Atlantic gymnast, Xenodermichthys copei, is a slickhead of the genus Xenodermichthys, found in the Atlantic, Indian, and Pacific oceans, and the Tasman Sea, at depths of  100 to 2,600 m.  This species grows to a length of  TL.

References
 
 
 Tony Ayling & Geoffrey Cox, Collins Guide to the Sea Fishes of New Zealand,  (William Collins Publishers Ltd, Auckland, New Zealand 1982) 

Alepocephalidae
Fish described in 1884